Oak Ridge is a town in Kaufman County, Texas, United States. The population was 495 at the 2010 census, up from 400 at the 2000 census.

Geography
Oak Ridge is located in north-central Kaufman County at  (32.652149, -96.261716), along Texas State Highway 34.

Demographics

As of the census of 2000, there were 400 people, 148 households, and 121 families residing in the town. The population density was 178.8 people per square mile (68.9/km2). There were 152 housing units at an average density of 67.9 per square mile (26.2/km2). The racial makeup of the town was 89.00% White, 6.00% African American, 4.00% from other races, and 1.00% from two or more races. Hispanic or Latino of any race were 7.25% of the population.

There were 148 households, out of which 27.7% had children under the age of 18 living with them, 75.7% were married couples living together, 4.7% had a female householder with no husband present, and 17.6% were non-families. 16.2% of all households were made up of individuals, and 2.7% had someone living alone who was 65 years of age or older. The average household size was 2.70 and the average family size was 2.99.

In the town, the population was spread out, with 23.8% under the age of 18, 4.5% from 18 to 24, 28.8% from 25 to 44, 27.5% from 45 to 64, and 15.5% who were 65 years of age or older. The median age was 41 years. For every 100 females, there were 91.4 males. For every 100 females age 18 and over, there were 95.5 males.

The median income for a household in the town was $53,958, and the median income for a family was $57,500. Males had a median income of $33,250 versus $22,083 for females. The per capita income for the town was $23,035. About 4.0% of families and 5.3% of the population were below the poverty line, including 3.6% of those under age 18 and 7.8% of those age 65 or over.

Education
The town is served by Kaufman Independent School District and Terrell Independent School District. All of the Kaufman ISD schools are in the city of Kaufman, and all of the Terrell ISD schools are in the city of Terrell.

References

Dallas–Fort Worth metroplex
Towns in Kaufman County, Texas
Towns in Texas